Hotel Transylvania: Transformania (also known as Hotel Transylvania 4) is a 2022 American computer-animated adventure comedy film produced by Columbia Pictures and Sony Pictures Animation and released by Amazon Studios. The fourth and final installment in the Hotel Transylvania franchise and the sequel to Hotel Transylvania 3: Summer Vacation (2018), the film is directed by Derek Drymon and Jennifer Kluska (in their respective feature-length directorial debuts) from a screenplay by Amos Vernon, Nunzio Randazzo and Genndy Tartakovsky (who directed the prior three films). It stars the voices of Andy Samberg, Selena Gomez (who also served as an executive producer alongside Tartakovsky and Michelle Murdocca), Kathryn Hahn, Jim Gaffigan, Steve Buscemi, Molly Shannon, David Spade, Keegan-Michael Key, Brian Hull, Fran Drescher, Brad Abrell, Asher Blinkoff, Tyler "Ninja" Blevins and Zoe Berri. In the film, Dracula and Johnny (Hull and Samberg), who transformed into a human and monster, must find the way to South America to revert, before their transformations become permanent.

Originally planned to be released theatrically in the United States on October 1, 2021, Sony Pictures Releasing cancelled the film's release plans and sold the film's distribution rights to Amazon Studios for $100 million, due to rising cases of the SARS-CoV-2 Delta variant in the United States. The film was released exclusively on Amazon Prime Video on January 14, 2022 and theatrically in China on April 3.

Plot

During the celebration of the 125th anniversary of Hotel Transylvania, Mavis overhears Dracula's plans to retire and leave the hotel to her and Johnny. She tells Johnny who excitedly tells Dracula his plans to renovate the hotel. Worried about Johnny ruining the hotel, Dracula lies to him saying that there is a "monster real-estate law" which only lets monsters own the hotel, disappointing Johnny.

Van Helsing decides to help Johnny using a ray that turns humans into monsters and vice versa; after testing it on his guinea pig Gigi, he uses it on Johnny who turns into a dragon-like monster. Learning about monster Johnny, Dracula tries to turn him back to normal, but accidentally turns himself into a human and breaks the ray's crystal. Van Helsing tells Dracula and Johnny that they can still turn themselves back to normal by getting a new crystal which lies in the Cave of Reflexion in South America, so Dracula and Johnny set off to do so.

Dracula's friends Frank, Wayne, Griffin and Murray end up becoming humans as well, as a result of drinking from a fountain that was contaminated by the ray. Mavis and Ericka confront Van Helsing after learning about Dracula and Johnny's whereabouts on the news, but he warns them about the effects of the ray, as humans who become monsters continue to mutate and become more hostile as time goes on. With this in mind, the rest of the gang head to South America to find Dracula and Johnny.

While traveling through the South American jungle, Dracula and Johnny begin to bond, and Dracula eventually begins to confess that he lied about the monster real-estate law, but the rest of the group find them. Things turn sour when Dracula admits his deception regarding passing over the hotel to Mavis and Johnny. This prompts an upset Johnny to believe Dracula does not consider him family and to mutate further before running away.

Mavis goes to find Johnny while Dracula and the rest of the gang go to the Cave of Reflexion. Mavis finds Johnny, but the transformation has turned him very volatile. She leads him to the Cave of Reflexion where they finally find the crystal. When Mavis tries to turn Johnny back to normal, nothing happens due to him being too frenzied. In desperation, Dracula lets himself get captured by Johnny and goes on a remorseful tangent about how wrong he was about Johnny and how he now sees the best in him, finally acknowledging him as family. This brings Johnny back to his senses, and he is returned to human form.

With Dracula and his friends turned back to normal, they return home only to find the hotel has been destroyed by Gigi. After turning Gigi back to normal, Dracula decides to let Mavis and Johnny rebuild the hotel to their liking.

One year later, Mavis and Johnny show Dracula the re-built Hotel Transylvania which he comes to enjoy.

Voice cast

 Andy Samberg as Jonathan "Johnny" Loughran, Mavis' husband, Dracula's son-in-law, Ericka's stepson-in-law and Dennis' father
 Selena Gomez as Mavis Dracula, Johnny's wife, Dracula's daughter, Ericka's stepdaughter and Dennis' mother
 Victoria Gomez voices a young Mavis Dracula
 Kathryn Hahn as Ericka Van Helsing, Dracula's wife, Mavis' stepmother, Johnny's stepmother-in-law, Dennis' step-grandmother and the great-granddaughter of Abraham Van Helsing
 Jim Gaffigan as Professor Abraham Van Helsing, a former monster hunter, Dracula's great-grandfather-in-law and ex-nemesis and Ericka's great-grandfather who invented the "Monsterfication Ray"
 Steve Buscemi as Wayne, a werewolf and Wanda's husband
 Molly Shannon as Wanda, a werewolf and Wayne's wife
 David Spade as Griffin, an invisible man
 Keegan-Michael Key as Murray, an ancient mummy
 Brian Hull as Count "Drac" Dracula, the founder of Hotel Transylvania and Mavis' father, Johnny's father-in-law, Dennis' maternal grandfather and Ericka's husband. He was originally voiced by Adam Sandler in the first three films
 Fran Drescher as Eunice, Frankenstein's wife
 Brad Abrell as Frankenstein, Eunice's husband. He was originally voiced by Kevin James in the first three films
 Asher Blinkoff as Dennis, the dhampir son of Johnny and Mavis, Vlad's great-grandson, Ericka's step-grandson and Dracula's grandson

 Zoe Berri as Winnie, a werewolf who is the daughter of Wayne and Wanda and a friend of Dennis. She was originally voiced by Sadie Sandler in the first three films
 Asher Bishop as Wesley, a werewolf who is the son of Wayne and Wanda
 Tyler "Ninja" Blevins as Party Monster
 Genndy Tartakovsky as Blobby, a green blob monster
 Victoria Gomez as Wilma, a werewolf who is the daughter of Wayne and Wanda
 Jennifer Kluska as Wendy, a werewolf who is the daughter of Wayne and Wanda
 Derek Drymon as a zombie that was briefly turned into a human
 Aaron LaPlante as:
 Gremlin Pilot
 Gremlin Stewardess
 Melissa Sturm as:
 Airbag Monster
 Voice on Phone
 Chloé Malaisé as Female Newscaster
 Scott Underwood as Male Newscaster
 Michelle Murdocca as Witch
 Will Townsend as Zombie

Production
In February 2019, Sony Pictures Animation announced that a fourth film had been in development. In October 2019, Genndy Tartakovsky confirmed that he would not direct the film. In September 2020, Jennifer Kluska and Derek Drymon, a storyboard artist on the first two Hotel Transylvania sequels and a former crew member of SpongeBob SquarePants and Adventure Time, respectively, were confirmed to be the film's directors, while Tartakovsky would write the screenplay and serve as an executive producer alongside Selena Gomez, who voices Mavis in the series. Production took place remotely during the COVID-19 pandemic.

In April 2021, the film's title was revealed to be Hotel Transylvania: Transformania and it was confirmed that it would be the final film in the franchise. That same month, Sony confirmed that Adam Sandler would not reprise his role as Dracula. The role was given to Brian Hull after voicing the character in the short film Monster Pets, while Kathryn Hahn, Steve Buscemi, David Spade, and Keegan-Michael Key were confirmed to reprise their roles. The following month, it was announced that Brad Abrell had replaced Kevin James as the voice of Frankenstein. Lynn Hobson served as editor.

Music
Mark Mothersbaugh returned to score the film, having previously scored the first three installments. The soundtrack was released on December 16, 2022 by Sony Classical. Additionally, the original end credits song Love Is Not Hard to Find were written by Morien van der Tang, Faried Arween Jhauw, Glen Faria & Jheynner Argot) and performed by Yendry and released on January 14, 2022.

Release
Hotel Transylvania: Transformania was released by Amazon Studios on Prime Video, on January 14, 2022. In February 2019, Sony Pictures Releasing scheduled the film for release on December 22, 2021. In April 2020, the film was moved up to August 6, 2021. In April 2021, the film was moved up again to July 23, 2021. In June 2021, the film was rescheduled to October 1, 2021, due to the COVID-19 pandemic.

In August 2021, Sony Pictures cancelled the film's theatrical plans and entered discussions to sell the distribution rights to a streaming service, in response to the rising cases of the SARS-CoV-2 Delta variant in the United States. On August 16, 2021, it was reported that Amazon Studios was in negotiations to acquire the distribution rights to the film for $100 million from Sony and would release it exclusively on Amazon Prime Video worldwide, excluding China, where Sony would release it theatrically on an undetermined date. Sony would also retain home entertainment and linear television rights to the film. On October 6, 2021, Amazon set a release date of January 14, 2022.

The film had a limited theatrical release on February 25, 2022. On March 7, 2022, it was announced that the film would have a theatrical release in China beginning April 3 of that year.

Reception

Critical response

Accolades
The film was nominated in two categories for "Outstanding Special Class Animated Program" and "Outstanding Sound Mixing and Sound Editing for an Animated Program" at the 1st Children's and Family Emmy Awards. At the 2023 Kids' Choice Awards, Selena Gomez won the award for "Favorite Voice from an Animated Movie (Female)".

References

External links
 
 

2020s American animated films
2020s children's animated films
2020s English-language films
2020s monster movies
2022 comedy films
2022 computer-animated films
2022 films
3D animated films
Amazon Studios films
American 3D films
American children's animated comedy films
American computer-animated films
American monster movies
American sequel films
Columbia Pictures animated films
Columbia Pictures films
Crossover films
Dracula films
Films about shapeshifting
Films based on The Invisible Man
Films directed by Derek Drymon
Films directed by Jennifer Kluska
Films postponed due to the COVID-19 pandemic
Films scored by Mark Mothersbaugh
Films set in hotels
Films set in Transylvania
Films set in South America
Films with screenplays by Genndy Tartakovsky
Frankenstein films
Hotel Transylvania
Mummy films
Sony Pictures Animation films
Werewolves in animated film
Amazon Prime Video original films